Saprinus is a genus of clown beetles belonging to the family Histeridae.

Species

 Saprinus aberlenci
 Saprinus acuminatus
 Saprinus addendus
 Saprinus aegialius
 Saprinus aegyptiacus
 Saprinus aeneolus
 Saprinus aeneus
 Saprinus aequalis
 Saprinus aeratus
 Saprinus africanus
 Saprinus algericus
 Saprinus alienus
 Saprinus amethystinus
 Saprinus apteli
 Saprinus artensis
 Saprinus austerus
 Saprinus australis
 Saprinus basalis
 Saprinus beduinus
 Saprinus bicolor
 Saprinus bicoloroides
 Saprinus biguttatus
 Saprinus bimaculatus
 Saprinus biplagiatus
 Saprinus blissonii
 Saprinus bousaadensis
 Saprinus brenskei
 Saprinus brunnivestis
 Saprinus buqueti
 Saprinus caeruleatus
 Saprinus caerulescens
 Saprinus calatravensis
 Saprinus cariniceps
 Saprinus cavalieri
 Saprinus centralis
 Saprinus chalcites
 Saprinus concinnus
 Saprinus confalonierii
 Saprinus cribellatus
 Saprinus cruciatus
 Saprinus crypticus
 Saprinus cupratus
 Saprinus cupreus
 Saprinus cyaneus
 Saprinus cyprius
 Saprinus dahlgreni
 Saprinus degallieri
 Saprinus delta
 Saprinus detersus
 Saprinus detritus
 Saprinus discoidalis
 Saprinus distinguendus
 Saprinus divergens
 Saprinus diversegenitalis
 Saprinus dussaulti
 Saprinus erichsonii
 Saprinus exiguus
 Saprinus externus
 Saprinus fallaciosus
 Saprinus felipae
 Saprinus figuratus
 Saprinus flexuosofasciatus
 Saprinus fraterculus
 Saprinus fraudulentus
 Saprinus frontistrius
 Saprinus fulgidicollis
 Saprinus funebris
 Saprinus furvus
 Saprinus gageti
 Saprinus gambiensis
 Saprinus georgicus
 Saprinus gilvicornis
 Saprinus godet
 Saprinus goergeni
 Saprinus graculus
 Saprinus grandiclava
 Saprinus guyanensis
 Saprinus havajirii
 Saprinus himalajicus
 Saprinus immundus
 Saprinus imperfectus
 Saprinus impressus
 Saprinus inausus
 Saprinus infimus
 Saprinus inflatus
 Saprinus intractabilis
 Saprinus intricatus
 Saprinus jacobsoni
 Saprinus kaszabianus
 Saprinus lateralis
 Saprinus lautus
 Saprinus lindrothi
 Saprinus lopatini
 Saprinus lucemseductus
 Saprinus lugens
 Saprinus lutshniki
 Saprinus maculatus
 Saprinus magnoguttatus
 Saprinus mastersii
 Saprinus melas
 Saprinus moyses
 Saprinus muelleri
 Saprinus multistriatus
 Saprinus namibiensis
 Saprinus niger
 Saprinus niponicus
 Saprinus nitiduloides
 Saprinus nitidus
 Saprinus nobilis
 Saprinus optabilis
 Saprinus oregonensis
 Saprinus ornatus
 Saprinus pamiricus
 Saprinus pecuinus
 Saprinus pensylvanicus
 Saprinus perinterruptus
 Saprinus pharao
 Saprinus planiusculus
 Saprinus politus
 Saprinus prasinus
 Saprinus profusus
 Saprinus proximus
 Saprinus pseudobicolor
 Saprinus pseudocyaneus
 Saprinus pulcher
 Saprinus punctatissimus
 Saprinus punctulatus
 Saprinus purpuricollis
 Saprinus quadriguttatus
 Saprinus rhodesiae
 Saprinus rhytipterus
 Saprinus ruber
 Saprinus rufulus
 Saprinus rugifer
 Saprinus rugipennis
 Saprinus secchi
 Saprinus sedakovii
 Saprinus semiopacus
 Saprinus semirosus
 Saprinus semistriatus
 Saprinus simplicifrons
 Saprinus simplicipennis
 Saprinus sinaiticus
 Saprinus spernax
 Saprinus sphingis
 Saprinus splendens
 Saprinus steppensis
 Saprinus sternifossa
 Saprinus strigil
 Saprinus stussineri
 Saprinus subcoerulus
 Saprinus subdiptychus
 Saprinus submarginatus
 Saprinus subnitescens
 Saprinus subustus
 Saprinus subvirescens
 Saprinus suturalis
 Saprinus tenuistrius
 Saprinus turcomanicus
 Saprinus walkeri
 Saprinus vatovai
 Saprinus vermiculatus
 Saprinus verschureni
 Saprinus versicolor
 Saprinus virescens
 Saprinus viridanus
 Saprinus viridicatus
 Saprinus viridipennis

References

Histeridae